The term Prince of the Church has historically been applied to cardinals of the Catholic church, and sometimes more broadly to senior members of the church hierarchy. It has been rejected by Pope Francis, who stated to a group of newly created cardinals "He (Jesus) does not call you to become 'princes' of the Church, to 'sit on his right or on his left.' He calls you to serve like Him and with Him."

The term is still applied, both seriously and as a criticism of their perceived attitudes of some cardinals

References

Sources 

 
Catholic ecclesiastical titles
Episcopacy in the Catholic Church
Cardinals (Catholic Church)